Dr Donald John Pinkava (1933–25 July 2017) was a botanist, specializing in cacti and succulents, and he is the discoverer of some of their varieties. He was Professor Emeritus at Arizona State University (ASU).  He was married to Mary Klements Pinkava, and they have one daughter, Michelle Shaw, and two grandchildren.

References

External links
 Biography and publications reference page at ASU
 
 Profile in SOLS magazine, page 3
 Citations and Articles
 

1933 births
2017 deaths
American botanists
Arizona State University faculty